The 1963 Georgia Tech Yellow Jackets football team represented the Georgia Institute of Technology during the 1963 NCAA University Division football season. The Yellow Jackets were led by 19th-year head coach Bobby Dodd, and played their home games at Grant Field in Atlanta. For the final time before becoming independent, they competed as members of the Southeastern Conference, finishing in sixth. Quarterback Billy Lothridge threw for 1,000 yards and 10 touchdowns and finished in 2nd in the Heisman Trophy voting.

Schedule

Source:

References

Georgia Tech
Georgia Tech Yellow Jackets football seasons
Georgia Tech Yellow Jackets football